The 2011 Touring Car Masters was Australian motor racing competition for modified Touring Cars. The series was open to cars manufactured between 1 January 1963 and 31 December 1973 and to specific models manufactured between 1 January 1974 and 31 December 1976. It was sanctioned by the Confederation of Australian Motor Sport (CAMS) as a National Series and ‘Australian Classic Touring Cars’ was appointed by CAMS as the Category Manager. The series was the fifth annual Touring Car Masters.

John Bowe (Ford Mustang) won Class C, Gary O'Brien (Holden HQ Monaro GTS) was victorious in Class B and Amanda Sparks (Porsche 911 RS) secured the Class A award.

Calendar

 

The series was contested over eight rounds.

Classes & points system
Each competing car was classified into one of three classes.	

Series points were awarded on the following basis within each class at each race.

Bonus points were awarded to each race finisher equal to the number of cars that started a race within that class. E.g. If 14 cars started a race in Class B, then each car that finished within Class B was awarded an additional 14 bonus points for that race.	

The driver gaining the highest points total from his/her best seven round results was declared the winner of that class.	

Any points scored by a driver within a class were not transferred if that driver changed classes.

Series standings

Notes & references

Touring Car Masters
Touring Car Masters